The Districts are an American rock band originally from Lititz, Pennsylvania. The group formed in 2009 while members Rob Grote, Mark Larson, Connor Jacobus, and Braden Lawrence were all still in high school.

History
The Districts were formed in 2009 by four high schoolers from Lititz, a small town in central Pennsylvania. The group self-released two EPs and a full-length album, Telephone, over the course of 2011 and 2012. Late in 2013, after a stint in viral success from a live studio session, The Districts signed with Fat Possum Records, and released an EP in early 2014 consisting of three remastered tracks from their previous releases and two new songs. By 2014 the group had relocated from Lititz to Philadelphia. In February 2015, the group's second full-length album, A Flourish and a Spoil, produced by John Congleton, also appeared on the Fat Possum label. This album peaked at #7 on the Billboard Heatseekers chart and #28 on the Top Independent Albums chart. In August 2017, the band released their third full length album, Popular Manipulations, once again under the Fat Possum label.

Members
Current
Rob Grote - vocals, guitar 
Braden Lawrence - drums
Pat Cassidy - guitar

Former
Mark Larson - guitar
Josh Sunseri
Connor Jacobus

Discography
Albums
Telephone (2012)
A Flourish and a Spoil (2015)
Popular Manipulations (2017)
 You Know I'm Not Going Anywhere (2020)
 Great American Painting (2022)

EPs
Kitchen Songs (2011)
While You Were in Honesdale (2012)
The Districts (2014)

References

External links

 Official website

Fat Possum Records artists
Indie rock musical groups from Pennsylvania
Musical groups from Philadelphia